Emil "Nacka" Bergman (July 28, 1908 – April 13, 1975) was a Swedish ice hockey player who competed in the 1928 Winter Olympics.

He was a member of the Swedish ice hockey team, which won the silver medal.

External links
 
 

1908 births
1975 deaths
Ice hockey players at the 1928 Winter Olympics
Medalists at the 1928 Winter Olympics
Olympic ice hockey players of Sweden
Olympic medalists in ice hockey
Olympic silver medalists for Sweden
People from Gävle Municipality
Swedish ice hockey right wingers
Sportspeople from Gävleborg County